Heathrow Airport bombing was an incident which happened on 20 April 1984, a bomb exploded in the baggage area of Terminal 2 at Heathrow Airport. The bomb exploded at 7:55 pm, as 60 people were inside the baggage area.  Commander William Hucklesby, at the time head of Scotland Yard's anti-terror branch, reported that the detonated device was constructed using  of commercial or military grade explosives. A hospital spokesperson stated that all but five victims were released shortly after being treated for minor scrapes, cuts and bruises.

John MacIntyre, a British customs official stationed in Terminal 2 when the detonation occurred said "There was a bloody big flash, a bang and lots of smoke. I saw a British Airways bloke with blood all over the back of his shirt. There was an Iberian Airways lost-baggage representative as well. He didn't seem to have any blood on him but he was soaking wet. I gathered the central heating unit had blown up or the pipes had burst."

The blast injured 23, one seriously. The Angry Brigade, an anarchist group, claimed responsibility for the bombing. British officials dismissed the claim, and instead pointed their fingers at "Libyan-related Arab groups". coming just three days after the murder of Yvonne Fletcher and wounding of 10 other demonstrators in the street by machine gun fire outside the Libyan Embassy in London. Libyan Arab Airlines used Terminal 2 for its flights into London Heathrow, which raised suspicion as to whether the two events were related. Scotland Yard investigators said that no planes had arrived from Tripoli, with the most recent being around noon, eight hours prior to the detonation. The area of the terminal where the detonation was pinpointed to serve as a storage facility for unclaimed baggage and bags that were to be rerouted to the correct destination. Explosive-detecting K9 units were dispatched to other parts of the airport, but no other explosives were found.

References

Terrorist attacks on airports
Improvised explosive device bombings in London
Terrorist incidents in the United Kingdom in 1984
Terrorist incidents in London in the 1980s
History of Heathrow Airport
1984 crimes in the United Kingdom
Heathrow Airport bombing
Terrorist incidents by unknown perpetrators
April 1984 events in the United Kingdom
Building bombings in London
Attacks on buildings and structures in 1984
Attacks on buildings and structures in London